Luís de Montalvor (January 31, 1891 – March 2, 1947) was a Portuguese poet and was known under the pseudonym Luís da Silva Ramos.

He founded the reviews Orpheu (modern Portuguese spelling: Orfeu) [Orpheus] 1914 and Centauro (Centaur) in 1916 and also worked in other reviews including Atlântida [Atlantis] (1915–20), Contemporânea (1915–26) [Contemporary], Presença and Sudoeste in 1935.

In 1933, he founded Editorial Ática, Lda. with its headquarters at a small ship at Rua das Chagas in Lisbon, in the early 1940s, he adopted the firm "Ática, S.A.R.L., Casa Editora"

In 1942, he published for the publishing company Ática (Attica) on the collection of poems made by the renowned Fernando Pessoa, the first of five volumes titled Complete Works (Obras Completas) of Fernando Pessoa, the remaining were Poems by Álvaro de Campos [Poesias de Álvaro de Campos] (1944), Odes by Ricardo Reis [Odes de Ricardo Reis] (1945), Mensagem [Messages] (1945) and Poems by Alberto Caeiro [Poemas de Alberto Caeiro] (1946), under Pessoa's pseudonyms.

Works
 História do regime republicano em Portugal [History of the Portuguese Republic Regime] (1929)
 A arte indígena portuguesa [Portuguese Indigenous Art] (1934) with Diogo de Macedo

Posthumous works
 Poemas [Poems] (1960)
 O livro de poemas de Luís de Montalvor [Book of Poems by Luís de Montalvor] (1998)
 Tentativa de um ensaio sobre a decadência (2008)
 «Para o túmulo de Fernando Pessoa»: e outras prosas (2015)

References

1891 births
1947 deaths
20th-century Portuguese poets
People from São Vicente, Cape Verde
Portuguese male poets
20th-century male writers